Adrienne Marden (born Mabel Adrienne Baruch, September 2, 1909 – November 9, 1978) was an American film and television actress.

Early years
Marden was born in Cleveland, Ohio, the daughter of Lenore (Stein) and Ralph Baruch. Marden attended the University of Michigan, where she was active in dramatics.

Career
Marden gained early acting experience in stock theater companies in Cleveland. She also directed musicals in some small towns in Ohio before moving to California and joining the Pasadena Playhouse.

One of Marden's first film roles was playing a czar's daughter in Rasputin and the Empress (1932), in which she was billed as Mabel Marden.

Marden debuted on Broadway in Merrily We Roll Along (1934). Her other Broadway credits include Hickory Stick (1943), The American Way (1938), and The Women (1936).

On radio, Marden had the role of Patricia Jordan on The Story of Bess Johnson and was on the American Drama School of the Air.

Personal life
On August 12, 1956, Marden married actor Wendell Holmes in Santa Monica, California.

Filmography

References

Bibliography
 Pitts, Michael R. Western Movies: A Guide to 5,105 Feature Films. McFarland, 2012.

External links
 

1909 births
1978 deaths
American film actresses
American television actresses
20th-century American actresses
University of Michigan alumni